For Madmen Only may refer to:

 For Madmen Only (Atomic Opera album)
 For Madmen Only (UK Decay album)
 For Madmen Only (Waxwing album), by Waxwing
 For Madmen Only! (Roadside Picnic album) by Roadside Picnic (band)